The Tempest was a sailing event on the Sailing at the 1976 Summer Olympics program in Kingston, Ontario . Seven races were scheduled. 32 sailors, on 16 boats, from 16 nations competed.

Results 

DNF = Did Not Finish, DNS= Did Not Start, DSQ = Disqualified, PMS = Premature Start, YMP = Yacht Materially Prejudiced 
 = Male,  = Female

The British pairing of Allen Warren and David Hunt had their boat, Gift 'Orse damaged while in transit to the competition, which impacted on their performance. After the final race, Warren and Hunt took some acetone and a flare and set the boat on fire.

Daily standings

Notes

References 
 
 
 
 

Tempest
Tempest (keelboat)